"Mmm...Skyscraper I Love You" is a 1993 single by Underworld. It did not make the charts.

The song's title comes from an art compilation by Underworld's design company, Tomato. The title included an ellipsis between the first two words when it appeared on the 1993 single, but it is then written without an ellipsis on the Dubnobasswithmyheadman album and on the band's compilation albums.

The Jam Scraper version was originally slated to appear on Dubnobasswithmyheadman, but was replaced by the original.

In an interview with Melody Maker Karl Hyde explained how he created the song's stream of consciousness lyrics:

Track listing

Vinyl: boix 13, 857 051-1; Vinyl promo: BOIXDJ 13 (UK)
 "Mmm...Skyscraper I Love You" – 13:09
 "Mmm...Skyscraper I Love You" (Telegraph 6.11.92) – 7:06
 "Mmm...Skyscraper I Love You" (Jam Scraper) – 9:12

CD: JBO / BOICD 13, 857 051-2 (UK) 
 "Mmm...Skyscraper I Love You" – 13:07
 "Mmm...Skyscraper I Love You" (Telegraph 6.11.92) – 6:51
 "Mmm...Skyscraper I Love You" (Jam Scraper) – 8:47

Notes
Sleeve design by Tomato.
The text 'THE EGG OF WINDS' is etched into the A-side of the 12", and 'I Am A TOMATO' is etched into the B-side.

References

External links
Underworldlive.com

Underworld (band) songs
1993 singles
Songs written by Darren Emerson
1993 songs
Songs written by Rick Smith (musician)
Songs written by Karl Hyde